Jay Miller is the current head coach of the Hofstra Pride softball team which represents Hofstra University in the Colonial Athletic Association. He was previously head coach of the softball teams at Purdue, Oklahoma City, Missouri, and Mississippi State.

Coaching career
Miller began coaching at Purdue after finishing his master's degree there. He then spent 3 seasons as an assistant coach at Missouri, helping lead the Tigers to two appearances in the Women's College World Series. Miller then moved on to Oklahoma City University, where he led the Stars to two appearances in the NAIA Women's College World Series, including a runner-up finish in 1986. Miller was also the pitching coach for the Netherlands Antilles team at the 1987 Pan American Games.

Miller returned to Missouri in 1988, where he spent fifteen seasons as the head coach, leading the Tigers to 2 conference championships, 5 NCAA Tournament appearances, and two Women's College World Series appearances. However, Miller was fired in 2002 after 3 straight losing seasons. Miller was then hired as head coach of Mississippi State, where he led the Bulldogs to 6 NCAA Tournament appearances in nine seasons, despite never having a winning conference record. Miller was fired after the 2011 season, his second straight losing season.

While at Mississippi State, Miller was also the head coach of the U.S. national team. He joined the staff at Louisville Cardinals softball in the fall of 2012., officially becoming pitching coach before the 2015 season.

In June 2018, Miller was named the head coach of the Hofstra Pride after spending three seasons as an assistant coach at Rutgers. Miller was inducted into the National Fastpitch Coaches Association Hall of Fame in 2008.

Head coaching record

References

Year of birth missing (living people)
Living people
American softball coaches
Purdue Boilermakers softball coaches
Oklahoma City Stars softball coaches
Mississippi State Bulldogs softball coaches
Louisville Cardinals softball coaches
Hofstra Pride softball coaches